is a passenger railway station located in the city of Matsudo, Chiba Prefecture, Japan, operated by the private railway operator Shin-Keisei Electric Railway.

Lines
Matsudo-Shinden Station is served by the Shin-Keisei Line, and is located 2.4 kilometers from the terminus of the line at Matsudo Station.

Station layout 
The station consists of dual opposed side platforms, connected by a footbridge.

Platforms

History
Matsudo-Shinden Station was opened on April 21, 1955. A new station building was completed in 2007.

Passenger statistics
In fiscal 2018, the station was used by an average of 6668 passengers daily.

Surrounding area
Matsudo Driving School
 Matsudo City General Hospital
 Matsudo City General Hospital School of Nursing
 Senshu University Matsudo Junior and Senior High School
 Chiba Prefectural Matsudo High School
 Matsudo City No. 6 Junior High School

See also
 List of railway stations in Japan

References

External links

  Shin Keisei Railway Station information

Railway stations in Japan opened in 1955
Railway stations in Chiba Prefecture
Matsudo